Konrad Ernst Eduard Henlein (6 May 1898 – 10 May 1945) was a leading Sudeten German politician in Czechoslovakia. Upon the German occupation in October 1938 he joined the Nazi Party as well as the SS and was appointed Gauleiter of the Sudetenland. He was appointed Reichsstatthalter of the Reichsgau Sudetenland upon its formation on 1 May 1939.

Early life
Konrad Henlein was born in Maffersdorf (present-day Vratislavice nad Nisou) near Reichenberg (Liberec), in what was then the Bohemian crown land of Austria-Hungary. His father, Konrad Henlein Sr., worked as an accounts clerk. His mother, Hedvika Anna Augusta Dworatschek (Dvořáčková), was the daughter of a family of Czech and German Bohemian origin. At the time when Henlein was growing up, Reichenberg was a center of tension between the long-established German community against newly arrived Czechs from the countryside who had come to work in the town's factories. The ethnic Germans of Reichenberg often cast Czechs as "ignorant peasants" whose cultural level was considered much lower than that of the German community  and willing to work for lower wages.  In 1912, the German community of Reichenberg attempted to leave the Austrian Crown land of Bohemia and to set up their district as a new Crown land which would not accept any Czechs, only to be overruled by Vienna which insisted that Bohemia was not divisible. It was in this atmosphere of German-Czech tensions that Henlein grew up and which shaped his views.

Henlein attended business school in Gablonz (Jablonec nad Nisou) and in World War I entered military service in the Austro-Hungarian Army as a military volunteer (Kriegsfreiwilliger), assigned to k.u.k. Tiroler Kaiser-Jäger-Regiment Nr. 3. In May 1916 he attended Officer Candidate School and then was assigned to k.u.k. Infanterie-Regiment Nr. 27 based in Graz. He saw Italian Front service in the Dolomites at Monte Forno, Mont Sief, and Monte Maletta from May 1916 to 17 November 1917.

He was severely wounded, then captured by Italian troops, and spent the remainder of the war as a POW held in captivity at Asinara Island, where he occupied his time studying the history of the German Turner (gymnastics) movement of Friedrich Ludwig Jahn. Although Henlein liked to "talk big" about his war experiences, his years 1917–19 as a POW undercut his glamorization of his war record. Nevertheless, his experiences as a Frontkämpfer (front fighter) who had been gassed and fought on the Italian front played an important role in shaping his politics. Henlein's perception of himself as a "soldier" for the Sudeten community dated from his war experiences, when he had fought for the Austrian empire, which disintegrated in October 1918 and thereby enabled many Sudeten Germans to cast themselves as  "victimized" in the new state of Czechoslovakia. Those who had served alongside Henlein called his war service "nothing special" and noted his tendency to exaggerate and invent details of his war record. His self-perception as a fighter for the Sudeten community was the key to understanding his subsequent career. The flight abroad by leaders of the new Czechoslovakia—such as the president Tomáš Garrigue Masaryk who sought the support of the Allies for independence from the Austrian Empire—was a source of much discontent in the Sudetenland where people had supported the Austrian war effort.

Völkisch gymnastics leader
Henlein returned home after the breakup of the Austro-Hungarian Monarchy in 1919 to work as a bank clerk in Gablonz, then part of the newly established Czechoslovakian state. The Sudeten German community had long been a stronghold of the völkisch movement, and Henlein embraced völkisch ideas as the best way forward for the ethnic Germans of the Sudetenland, who had been the "insiders" favored by the authorities in the old Austrian Empire and who were now suddenly the outsiders in the new Czechoslovak republic, a change of status that most Sudetenlanders found very jarring and painful. Henlein joined the Turnerbund (gymnastics association), which played an oversized role in the Sudeten German community life which outsiders often missed, and by 1923, he was responsible for promoting völkisch ideology in his local turner club as the best way to deal with the current "national crisis" facing the Sudeten community. A central tenant of  völkisch ideology had always been that healthy bodies made for a healthy race, and as a result, there had always been a close connection between sports and völkisch activities in the German-speaking world. Influenced by the German national movement, Henlein became a gym teacher of the gymnastics club in Asch (Aš) in 1925, which, similar to the Czech Sokol movement, took an active part in Sudeten German communal life. Given the importance of the turnerbund to Sudeten community life, Henlein's position as a turnerbund leader gave him far more importance than what his position would suggest.

Under his leadership, his local association of the Turnerbund continued to grow, and Henlein became a well-known figure in the Sudetenland. During this time, Henlein worked very closely with another Turnerbund leader, Heinz Rutha, who wrote articles arguing for the Turnerbund to become a type of political party which would nurture völkisch ideas amongst the youth. In July 1923, Rutha first met Henlein when he heard the latter give a "fiery speech" at the local turner club, and the two become inseparably close as the two shared a common interest in promoting a sense of völkisch-tinged nationalism together with physical activities amongst young men (neither Henlein nor Rutha ever had much interest in young women). Rutha was active in the Wandervogel youth movement where he took young men out for long camping trips in the Sudeten mountains and forests, where they would contemplate the beauties of nature, sing German nationalist songs, and cultivate a sense of brotherhood. Rutha, who believed in the unity of "body and soul", often saying that healthy male bodies made for a healthy race, had decided to link his wandervogel group with the turner movement.

For Henlein, preserving a sense of masculinity and with it "healthy" male bodies was the key concern for his work with the Turnerbund. The British historian Mark Cornwall noted that Henlein's language was very gendered as he always spoke about preserving the "German male hero" which was his ideal of what a Sudeten man should be. In an article in 1925, Henlein urged his followers to be "complete men" and "dress in a manly way!" Reflecting his fear that men were starting to "go soft" becoming like women, Henlein wrote: "Our age bears all the signs of decadence and decline. Mannestum (maleness) and a sense of heroism have been rare among us Germans; a weaker, slacker, more effeminate trait is dominant, something emasculating, which will never be constructive for our people!" Through Henlein's colleagues found him to be a friendly and affable man, who was a natural mediator, he was well known as a tough disciplinarian who imposed rigorously demanding and quasi-military training on the young men involved in his gym club."

As the men in Henlein's club were noticeably more successful at sports than those from elsewhere, from 1926 Henlein became an increasingly well known figure in the Sudetenland. That same year, young men from Henlein's club in Asch beat several Czech athletics in a gymnastics competition in Prague, a success that won Henlein much attention in the Sudetenland." Henlein's mentor Rutha called for a youthful männerbund  (male elite) whose bodies were to be as well developed as their minds, who would serve as the leadership cadre for the Sudeten community." Though Henlein did not entirely embrace the barely veiled homo-eroticism of Rutha's  männerbund concept which celebrated the beauty of the male body, the concept of a  männerbund of Führern (leaders) who were to command unconditional loyalty from the entire Sudeten community influenced Henlein's politics.

In May 1928, Henlein in an article in the Turnerbund journal Turnerzeitung called for the Turnerbund to become the "school" of the Sudeten nation. Politics in the Sudetenland were not so much divided between left and right (though such divisions did exist) as between loyalists "activists" who wanted the Sudeten Germans to take part in the politics of Czechoslovakia and the separatist "negativists" who did not. Henlein with his völkisch sympathies was a "negativist" and by 1928 the Turnerbund was beginning to set itself up as a proto-political party that stood in opposition to the "activist" parties that were serving in the coalition governments in Prague. In another article in Turnerzeitung published in December 1930, Henlein called for all Sudeten Germans to embrace völkisch ideology and condemned liberalism and democracy as "un-German". Henlein wrote it was the  "disciplined Männerbunde who rule the present: Fascism, the Hitler movement, the Heimwehr, etc"  and stated that the Turnerbund was in tune with these "modern phenomena".

In May 1931, Henlein was elected president of the Turnerbund, which increased his profile in the Sudeten community. Under his leadership, the supposedly apolitical Turnerbund become more overtly völkisch and decidedly militaristic as the purpose of the Turnerbund now become to indoctrinate its members with the "spirit of the heroic [ethnic] German front-line soldier". In July 1933, Henlein staged a festival in Saaz (modern Žatec, Czech Republic) where before 50,000 guests, some 20,000 Turnerbund members performed a carefully choreographed display of uniformity as they all marched together while Henlein in his speech proclaimed the Turnerbund was now the "educational body of the Sudeten Germans".

Party leader
After the Saaz rally, Henlein was widely viewed as the "man of the hour" and knowing that the Czechoslovak authorities were about to ban the two main  völkisch parties in the Sudetenland as treasonous, Henlein decided to enter politics to fill the vacuum. On 1 October 1933, Henlein founded the Sudetendeutsche Heimatfront ("Sudeten German Home Front", SHF). Although the SHF was originally meant as a successor organisation of the banned anti-Czech German National Socialist Workers' Party and German National Party, it soon became a big tent right-wing movement in order to achieve a status of autonomy for the German minority, rivalling with the German Social Democratic Workers Party. Henlein's association with the Catholic Kameradschaftsbund that followed the teachings of the Austrian philosopher Othmar Spann allowed him to argue to the Czechoslovak authorities that his movement was not a continuation of the banned parties. The American historian Gerhard Weinberg described Henlein as "...a thirty-five year-old veteran of the war who had achieved prominence in a racist athletic organization in the Sudeten area. He now rallied around himself a motley assortment of elements that were long involved in internal feuds but were eventually to be uniformly utilized by Berlin to bring disaster upon the Czechoslovak state as well as themselves".

Henlein was not a charismatic personality, but the British historian Mark Cornwall wrote that he was "attractive to the Sudeten population precisely because of his ordinariness, to be an Everyman who represented the average Sudeten German's grievances". Henlein was on the völkisch right, but he saw himself as the founder of a volksgemeinschaft ("people's community") that would represent the interests of all Sudeten Germans, which he always saw as his main concern. A recurring theme of Henlein's speeches was his intense "Sudetenness", a man who spoke lovingly of the Sudeten mountains, valleys and forests, and who presented the Sudeten Germans as a special and unique German community. These "aberrations" on the part of Henlein in pressing for Sudeten "particularism" were later to cause Henlein much trouble under the Third Reich when grossdeutschland nationalists like Reinhard Heydrich took exception to these speeches.  Cornwall wrote that "...there slowly developed a chasm between Henlein's self-perception as a Sudeten Führer and the reality of a man who lacked both charisma and political acumen. He could certainly lead independently on occasions, making abrupt, obstinate decisions that affected his movement's direction. But his constituency was too broad and divided, and his personality too bland, to ensure that in the following years all in the movement were 'working towards the same Führer".

In the first half of the 1930s, Henlein held a pro-Czechoslovak and overtly anti-Nazi view in his public views and speeches. As early as 15 May 1934, the Czechoslovak Foreign Minister Edvard Beneš in a note to President Tomáš Garrigue Masaryk accused Henlein's Heimfront of being financially supported by Berlin. Beneš's suspicions were correct. From April 1934 onward, the Heimfront was being subsidized by not only the Auswärtiges Amt, but also by the Verband für das Deutschtum im Ausland ("Society for Germandom Abroad"). To avoid having his party banned by a Czechoslovak government that clearly disliked his movement, Henlein always praised democracy in his speeches, but there was always a pronounced völkisch tone in his writings and speeches. The major theme of Henlein's speeches was always for the need for "unity" in the Sudeten German community to allow the Sudetenlanders to present themselves as "one body" that would be able to talk to the Czechs Volk to Volk and thus "right" the ""injustice of 1918".

The particular "righting" of the "injustice of 1918" that Henlein wanted was to give the Sudetenland autonomy in Czechoslovakia, and once that autonomy was achieved, society in the Sudetenland should be reorganized along Catholic corporatist lines. Reflecting the völkisch influence, Henlein spoke often of creating the volksgemeinschaft ("people's community") that would make the Sudeten German community into one. In his speeches, Henlein also described the SdP as having a "Christian worldview", which in Central Europe at the time was a code-word for being anti-Semitic. The intentional confusion in Henlein's speeches about whatever the volksgemeinschaft he wanted was to be organized along Catholic or völkisch lines or perhaps both reflected his need to appeal to two types of voters in the Sudetenland. At the same time, Henlein spoke of the Sudeten Germans living in a Central European "common space" with an identity that transcended loyalty to Czechoslovakia; the Sudetenland was regarded as part of a wider Germanic "common space" that embraced all of Central Europe. Henlein did not present this idea of a "common space" as anti-Czech, and in a speech in October 1934 in Böhmisch Leipa (modern Česká Lípa, Czech Republic) spoke of a coming "reconciliation" between the Germans and Czechs, saying that relations between the two peoples would soon return to where they had been in the "golden days" of the Holy Roman Emperor Charles IV, provided that the Czechs recognised that Sudetenlanders and they themselves belonged to the Central European "common space". Despite his claims to be loyal to Czechoslovakia and its mosaic of peoples, Henlein always portrayed life over the border in Germany as far superior to Czechoslovakia, and he encouraged his followers to boycott businesses owned by Czechs and Jews.

On 19 April 1935 the SHF was renamed Sudeten German Party (Sudetendeutsche Partei, SdP) under pressure from Czechoslovak government.  In the parliamentary election of May 1935, the SdP with massive support by the Nazi Party gained 15.2% of the votes cast, becoming the strongest of all Czechoslovak parties, and winning about 68% of the ethnic German vote. The fact that the unemployment rate in the Sudetenland was twice the level in the Czech areas of Bohemia and Moravia contributed to a sense of resentment in the Sudetenland against Prague that Henlein was able to capitalize on in the 1935 election. The SdP by this time was being secretly subsidised by the Auswärtiges Amt and in the year 1935 alone received 15,000 Reichsmark from the German legation in Prague. Under the Weimar Republic, the Auswärtiges Amt had begun subsidizing the Czechoslovak political parties representing the German minority, and starting in 1933, the scale of the subsidies had greatly increased with SdP becoming the main recipient of German money in the spring of 1935. In part, the victory of the SdP in the 1935 elections was due to generous financial support from Germany as SdP ran a slick, well-polished campaign that overshadowed the rival ethnic German parties. Weinberg wrote about the relationship between the SdP and Germany: "The financing of the Henlein party from Berlin was known to the Prague government, and Berlin in turn knew that the Czech government was aware of the facts".

Germany was not the only foreign government with which Henlein was in contact. Though the SdP had won the majority of the seats in the Sudetenland, the numerical dominance of the Czech parties ensured that the SdP was always going to be an opposition party. The main right-wing Czech parties favored preserving Czechoslovakia as a unitary state, and Henlein's talks with the Czech right quickly floundered on this issue. Czech public opinion was overwhelmingly hostile to calls to turn Czechoslovakia into a federation. Unable to influence "the Castle", which rejected out of hand Henlein's call for autonomy, Henlein turned to courting foreign governments, especially Britain, out of the hope that they might pressure "the Castle" to grant autonomy to the Sudetenland. Henlein's voters had expected him to achieve his platform of autonomy for the Sudetenland and his turning towards "foreign policy" in 1935 reflected his fear of disappointing his supporters. The fact that public opinion in Britain in the interwar period tended to view the Treaty of Versailles as a French-engineered "Carthaginian peace" made Britain the most favorable of the victors of 1918 to revising the Treaty of Versailles and it was towards Britain that Henlein placed his main hope in pressuring "the Castle" for concessions.

In July 1935, Henlein first met the British spy, RAF Group-Captain Graham Christie, who was to be his main conduit with the British for the next three years. Henlein enjoyed being courted by foreign governments as it strengthened his authority over his party, where his leadership was frequently questioned. The Sudeten German culture, like the culture in the rest of the German-speaking world at this time was a "Führer culture" with the expectation that history was made by few "Great Men" whom mere mortals were supposed to follow unconditionally, and given this milieu, Henlein's leadership style was authoritarian. Henlein sometimes made decisions without consulting the committee he was ostensibly responsible to, and he constantly lied and dissembled even to his closest followers.

However, despite his attempts to present himself as a Führer who commanded blind loyalty from his followers, Henlein's status was actually that of a primus inter pares who had to deal with a quarreling committee badly divided between Catholic traditionalists and völkisch nationalists, and Henlein frequently had to threaten to resign as a way of asserting his authority. Gestures like when Henlein summoned all of the SdP deputies to Eger (modern Cheb, Czech Republic) to publicly swear personal oaths of loyalty to Führer Henlein represented his weakness as a party leader, not his strength. Not all of the committee members were aware of the fact that the SdP was being secretly funded by the German government, and one of the committee's members who did know about the subsidies from Germany was Henlein's rival, Karl Herman Frank, who sometimes used that information to blackmail him. Despite Henlein's frequent claims to have no contact with Germany, Weinbeg wrote "...in fact the internal affairs of the Sudeten German party were being supervised by Berlin with the German government picking the leaders, settling the policy lines, and giving or withholding financial support as the situation appeared to dictate".

In December 1935, Henlein visited London on the invitation of Captain Christie and gave a lecture at the Chatham House on the situation of the Sudeten Germans. The historian Robert William Seton-Watson interviewed Henlein afterwards and in a summary wrote that Henlein accepted:

...the existing constitution, treaties and the Minority treaties as the basis of a settlement between Czechoslovakia and the Sudeten Germans. He ruled out not only all questions of German Bohemia (either as a whole or in part) uniting with Germany, but also admitted the impossibility of separating the German and Czech districts, and insisted on the essential unity of the Bohemian lands throughout history and no less today.

Henlein further told Seton-Watson that he was for "honest democracy" and his speeches criticizing Czechoslovak democracy were only because it was "dishonest democracy". Henlein admitted his party was a völkisch party, but denied having any contacts with Germany, saying that the claim his party was being subsidized by the German government was a "lie". Seton-Watson was something skeptical of Henlein, asking if it was really possible for someone to believe in both völkisch ideology and in German-Czech equality, but noted that Henlein was a man who seemed very sincere in his statements. The problems of Czechoslovakia rarely attracted much attention in Britain before 1938, but the few who did follow the issues in Central Europe tended to be very sympathetic towards the Sudeten Germans, taking the line at the time that it was one of the great "injustices" of the treaties of Versailles and St. Germain that the Sudetenland was not allowed to join Germany or Austria as the majority of the Sudetenlanders had asked for in 1918–19. Given these sympathies, Henlein was well received at the Chatham House.

In May 1936, the Czechoslovak Prime Minister Milan Hodža, knowing of the fractiousness of the SdP, declared in a speech: "The government would take care that Henlein achieved no success, and it was confident that the SdP would then split up into various factions that could then be more easily handed". On 12 June 1936, Henlein complained in a speech in Eger that the problem with the law in Czechoslovakia was it protected only the rights of individuals, instead of "racial groups". Henlein argued that the protecting the rights of the individual meant nothing unless the law also protected people's right to assert their own "racial identity". Henlein's insistence that group rights reflected the völkisch concept, that ultimately that it was the collective rather the individual that really mattered,  was a direct challenge to the concept of Czechoslovakia as a place where the rights of the individual were what ultimately mattered.

In July 1936, Henlein again went to London where he expounded upon various grievances felt by the volksdeutsche of Czechoslovakia, which led the Permanent Undersecretary of the Foreign Office, Sir Robert Vansittart, to write after meeting him: "It may well be that Germany has designs on Czechoslovakia in any event, but it is quite certain that at present the Czechoslovak government are providing them with an ever open door and a first-class pretext". In August 1936, Henlein visited Berlin to attend the Olympics and where he first met Hitler, albeit for a meeting that lasted for a few minutes. It was known in London from 1936 onward that Henlein's party was being secretly subsidised by Germany with one Foreign Office official writing in April 1937 when a journalist from The News Chronicle presented evidence that Germany was financing the SdP that these documents "do not really tell us anything new". In the fall of 1936, President Beneš, despite his distaste for Henlein, used an intermediary, Prince Max von Hohenlohe-Langenburg, to try very tentatively to open talks with him, but Henlein following orders from Berlin proceeded to ignore the feelers.

Starting in January 1937, the British government made a major push for the Czechoslovak president Edvard Beneš to negotiate with Henlein about his demands for autonomy for the Sudetenland, but Beneš refused, saying he believed that Czechoslovakia's future was a bright one. The French minister in Prague, Victor de Lacroix, supported Beneš, saying that any concession to Henlein would weaken France's ally Czechoslovakia, and thus the entire cordon sanitaire as the French alliance system in Eastern Europe was known. As France was Czechoslovakia's most powerful ally, Beneš felt no need to give in to the British pressure in 1937 for talks with Henlein about the devolving power from the Castle. Weinberg argued that this was a great missed opportunity for Beneš as "...the way to show up Henlein as disloyal was for the Czechoslovak government to make him a real offer which he would either have to accept, thereby recognizing the willingness of the Prague government to make meaningful concessions, or reject and thereby show himself uninterested in agreement. Such a development would not take until the very last stages of the 1938 negotiations".

However, in February 1937, Beneš did promise to have "ethnic proportionality" in the Czechoslovak civil service, more funding to ethnic German cultural groups, a guarantee that government contracts for public works would go to businesses owned by ethnic Germans in areas where Germans where the majority, the distribution of government spending on a regional basis, and to allow greater use of German as one of the official languages of Czechoslovakia. Even through Beneš had addressed many of the complaints made by the Sudetenlanders, on 27 April 1937, Henlein in a speech before the chamber of deputies demanded that all of the "racial groups" of Czechoslovakia be automatically enrolled in "national organisations" which would be separate legal entities and would direct all of the internal affairs of their own "racial group". Henlein argued that all people when they turned 18 would be legally obliged to choose their own "racial group" for life, and each of the "national organisations" would elect a "spokesman" who would not serve in parliament, but would serve as the representative of their "racial group" within the Czechoslovak state. Once a citizen had chosen their "national organisation" at the age of 18, they would not be allowed to leave it. Henlein concluded that each of the "racial groups" needed their own "national organisation" to provide the necessary space to allow them to develop in peace. These demands were rejected by Beneš as an attempt to gut Czechoslovak unity by turning it into a series of corporate "racial groups" governing themselves. However, Henlein's demands served to distract attention from the February reforms and allowed him to once again present the Sudeten Germans as being "oppressed" as Beneš was denying them the right to their own "racial identity".

In the meantime, Henlein was engaging in a "soft power" offensive, being interviewed by the famous historian Arnold J. Toynbee for The Economist in July 1937, where he insisted he was loyal to Czechoslovakia, but talked much about how the Czech-dominated government was discriminating against the Sudeten Germans in various ways. The speech by Hodža, where he pointed out the Czechoslovak state provided far more money in subsidies to German cultural groups than to cultural groups of the other minorities and that government spending in the Sudetenland was well above the 23% level required by "the principle of proportionality" which required that spending be matched to the size of the ethnic groups attracted little attention in the British media, which largely repeated variations of Henlein's line that the Sudeten Germans were the victims of "oppression" by the Czech-dominated Czechoslovak state.

Even with the newfound power of the SdP, gained with the help of the Nazis, Henlein did not become a declared follower of Adolf Hitler until 1937; after the pro-German camp within the SdP represented by Karl Hermann Frank emerged victorious. Newer research shows his position within the SdP became very difficult, when in October 1937 the Czechoslovak authorities were tipped off (possibly by the German secret service) about the homosexuality of Heinz Rutha, one of his closest allies, who was imprisoned on charges that he had sexual relations with young men who were active in the SdP. Rutha hanged himself in a jail cell awaiting trial. Henlein then swiftly aligned himself with the slogan Ein Volk, ein Reich, ein Führer! ("One People, One Country, One Leader!"), thus calling for the predominantly (typically more than 80%) German-speaking Sudetenland to be a part of Germany. Unknown to Henlein, on 5 November 1937 at the conference in Berlin recorded in the Hossbach memorandum, Hitler declared that he was planning to attack Austria and Czechoslovakia in the very near-future. The British historian Richard Overy noted in the Hossbach memorandum that Hitler said nothing about Czechoslovakia's treatment of the Sudeten Germans as a reason for war, instead giving the reasons that Germany was falling behind in the arms race with Britain and France, and so needed to conquer Czechoslovakia to exploit its resources, industries and people to gain the lead in the arms race and to provide for economic autarky to make Germany immune to a British blockade.

On 19 November 1937, Henlein sent Hitler a letter asking him to support his claim to be the sole leader of the Sudeten German community, declared his belief that ethnic Germans and Czechs simply could not coexist in the same country, and declared himself willing to support any German foreign move that would bring the Sudetenland "home to the Reich". The Rutha scandal together with Henlein's inability to achieve the autonomy he had promised his voters in 1935 left Henlein's position as party leader weakened and he decided to fully align himself with Berlin as the only way to save his career. On 3 November 1937, Henlein in a letter to Christie wrote: "the policy which I have represented up to now is only sustainable if it results in concrete success".

The 1938 crisis
The dominance by Henlein's political party of the Sudetenland in the 1930s set off the crisis that led to the Munich Agreement on 30 September 1938. On 12 March 1938, the British Foreign Secretary Lord Halifax once again told Jan Masaryk, the Czechoslovak minister in London, that his government should try to negotiate with Henlein, only to be rebuffed with Masaryk saying that Henlein was not to be trusted and it was a waste of time to talk to him. The Anschluss in March 1938 caused much excitement in the Sudetenland and throughout the month of March the StP had huge rallies where portraits of Hitler were prominently displayed while the crowds shouted "Ein Volk, ein Reich, ein Führer!" and "Home to the Reich!". Henlein in his speeches at these rallies now declared that now more than ever his party was the only party that spoke for the Sudetenland. Two of the Sudeten "activist" parties, the Christian Social Party and the German Agrarian Party, both quit the government in Prague, declaring that they now stood behind Führer Henlein.

On 28 March 1938, Henlein secretly visited Berlin to meet Hitler, where it was agreed that Henlein would make demands for autonomy for the Sudetenland that would provide the pretext for a German invasion. Henlein was informed that Hitler now believed that Italy could hold both Britain and France in check and there was no danger of a German attack on Czechoslovakia causing a wider war. Hitler told Henlein the "question of Czechoslovakia would be before very long" and Henlein's task was to press for autonomy by making demands that the Castle could never give. Henlein promised Hitler "We must make demands that cannot be satisfied". At a second meeting on 29 March 1938 held at the Auswärtiges Amts headquarters on the Wilhelmstrasse attended by Hitler, Henlein, the Foreign Minister Joachim von Ribbentrop and the State Secretary Baron Ernst von Weizsäcker to work out the tactics to be followed, Henlein was told to always come across as moderate even when making extreme demands, not to move too quickly, and above all never to negotiate in good faith with the Castle.

Hitler wanted Henlein to demand that the Sudeten Germans serve in their own regiments with German as the language of command, but Henlein persuaded him that to keep that demand in reserve, to be made later in case the Castle gave in. Hitler always made it clear that he did not want a general war in 1938 and it was necessary to isolate Czechoslovakia internationally before going to war by making it appear that the Czechoslovak government was being intransigent, which was especially important as France and Czechoslovakia had signed a defensive alliance in 1924. In this regard, Hitler also authorized Henlein to make contacts with other parties representing the Slovak, Polish, Ukrainian and Magyar minorities in order to engage in a joint campaign to make Czechoslovakia into a federation as that would make Czechoslovakia appear unstable and rickety, and hence would presumably increase the unwillingness of France to go to war for a state that seemed unlikely to last. However, Hitler told Henlein not to become too closely associated with the parties representing the other minorities as he wanted the main story in the world media to be that of Czech "oppression" of the Sudeten Germans. Finally, Henlein was told to ask only for autonomy, but to subtly promote the message that ethnic Germans and Czechs could not co-exist in the same country. On 5 April 1938, Henlein told a Hungarian diplomat that "whatever the Czech government might offer, he would always raise still higher demands...he wanted to sabotage an understanding by all means because this was the only method to blow up Czechoslovakia quickly".

On 24 April 1938, at a party congress in Karlsbad, Czechoslovakia (modern Karlovy Vary, Czech Republic), Henlein announced the 8-point Karlsbad programme for autonomy for the Sudetenland while still insisting he and his party were loyal to Czechoslovakia. The apparent moderation of the Karlsbad programme in only demanding autonomy for the Sudetenland masked a sinister purpose, namely to make it appear that Czechoslovakia was the intransigent one in refusing to grant autonomy for the Sudetenland, thus "forcing" Germany to invade. Czechoslovakia was a unitary state, and Czech public opinion was consistently hostile for plans for federalism in Czechoslovakia. If in the unexpected event that the Czechoslovak president Edvard Beneš gave in to all of the 8 points of the Karlsbad programme, then Henlein was to escalate by demanding that ethnic Germans of the Sudetenland serve in their own regiments where German was to be the language of command and that the German regiments would be under the control of the Sudeten regional government rather than the federal government in Prague, which both Henlein and Hitler knew was something that Beneš would never give.

Hitler had wanted the demand for German regiments to be the 9th point in the Karlsbad programme, but Henlein persuaded him that that one was too inflammatory and too likely to alienate public opinion abroad. The Karlsbad programme set off the crisis that led to the Munich Agreement in September. Henlein's speech in Karlsbad announcing the 8 points of the programme received extensive newspaper coverage all over the world, and raised acute tensions between Berlin and Prague when the German government declared its support for the Karlsbad programme. During the Karlsbad party congress, Henlein also added the "Aryan paragraph" to the StP, formally adopting völkisch racism. Despite this, Basil Newton, the British minister in Prague, described Henlein to London as a "moderate", saying it was time for the Castle to make concessions before Henlein lost control of his party.

Czechoslovakia was allied to France, and any German attack on the former would cause a war with the latter. Furthermore, though Great Britain had no alliance with Czechoslovakia, it was likely that if a Franco-German war began, then Britain would intervene rather than risk the possibility of France being defeated, which make Germany the dominant power in Europe. It was precisely for this reason that Britain become involved in the Sudeten crisis it was assumed in London that Germany would defeat France without Britain and the possibility of Germany as the dominant power in Europe was seen as unacceptable in Whitehall; the British wanted to stop a German-Czechoslovak war because it would lead to a Franco-German war that Britain would inevitably become involved in. Furthermore, the Soviet Union was allied to Czechoslovakia and would also be drawn in the war. However, the terms of the Soviet-Czechoslovak treaty stated that the Soviets were only obliged to declare war on Germany if France likewise did so. Much of the Wehrmacht leadership, led by the Chief of the General Staff, General Ludwig Beck, objected to Hitler's plans to attack Czechoslovakia in 1938 as likely to cause Germany to be embroiled in a war with France, the Soviet Union and probably Britain at a time when Beck and the other Wehrmacht generals believed that German rearmament was not sufficient advanced for another world war. Beck himself had no moral objections to attacking Czechoslovakia, writing to the Commander-in-chief of the Army, General Walter von Brauchitsch, on 30 May 1938 that "Czechoslovakia in the form imposed by the Diktat of Versailles is unbearable for Germany", but wanted at least five more years for Germany to rearm before undertaking any operation that was likely to cause a major war. Until the spring of 1938, German military planning for a war with Czechoslovakia was based on the assumption that when the Reich went to war with France again (something that the entire Wehrmacht leadership regarded as both inevitable and desirable), it was would also go to war with France's ally Czechoslovakia. In the spring of 1938, Hitler had decided to attack Czechoslovakia first "before the completion of Germany's full preparedness for war" on the assumption that France would remain neutral, an assumption that Beck and even some of the Nazi leaders like Hermann Göring regarded as absurd.

For this reason, Henlein assumed a major role in Hitler's plans for aggression against Czechoslovakia. On 21 April 1938, Hitler told General Wilhelm Keitel of the OKW of the "political preconditions" for a war against Czechoslovakia, stating to avoid a "hostile world opinion which might lead to a critical situation", what was needed was a period of crisis of acute diplomatic tension and "incidents" in the Sudetenland in which Czechoslovakia was to be cast as the aggressor. Once world opinion was turned against Czechoslovakia, which would lead to Britain pressuring France to abandon the alliance with Czechoslovakia, a major "incident" was to occur with the "expendable" Baron Ernst von Eisenlohr, the German minister in Prague, to be assassinated, which then lead to Germany attacking Czechoslovakia. For this reason, it was imperative that Henlein wage a public relations campaign presenting the Sudetenlanders as victimized by Prague to win over public opinion abroad to create a political preconditions for a localized war in Central Europe that would be limited only to Czechoslovakia. Though it was only on 28 May 1938 that Hitler issued the orders for Fall Grun (Case Green), the invasion of Czechoslovakia, scheduled for 1 October 1938, the general tenor of his remarks in private together with the direction of his diplomacy suggested he was seriously contemplating invading Czechoslovakia from March 1938 onward.

The German ambassador to Great Britain, Herbert von Dirksen, had advised Berlin that the German case would seem stronger to the British people if Henlein and his movement were not seen as working for Berlin, and that Henlein should visit London to promote this idea. Henlein first went to Berlin, where he was given a memo written by Weizsäcker telling him what to say in London. Weizsäcker wrote: "Henlein will deny in London that he is acting on instructions from Berlin...Finally, Henlein will speak of the progressive disintegration of the Czech political structure, in order to discourage those circles which consider that their intervention on behalf of this structure may still be of use". Starting on 12 May 1938, Henlein visited London to press his case for autonomy, and impressed almost everyone he met as an apparently reasonable, mild-mannered man full of genial charm, who was simply asking for autonomy for his people. Henlein told the various British politicians he met that he was not working for Hitler, talked much about the Czechs were "oppressing" the ethnic Germans of the Sudetenland by forcing ethnic German children in some districts to attend schools where they were taught in Czech, and insisted he only wanted autonomy for the Sudetenland. During his London trip, Henlein consistently promoted the line that he only wanted a "fair deal" for the Sudeten Germans and claimed that he was against the Sudetenland joining Germany, noting how after the Anschluss the Austrian Nazis were pushed aside by the German Nazis, and said he did not want the same thing to happen to him. However Henlein did admit that if Prague refused to give in to all of the 8 demands of the Karlsbad programme, then Germany would definitely invade Czechoslovakia. No British politician in the cabinet met Henlein during his time in London as it was felt to be inappropriate for ministers of the Crown to meet an opposition politician from another country, but Henlein did meet with many backbenchers and journalists who came away sympathetic to Henlein's movement after meeting him.

At a luncheon hosted by the National Labour MP Harold Nicolson, Henlein met with various backbenchers from all parties, where he impressed them with his genial charm and mild-mannered ways, coming across as the voice of reason and moderation. However, several of the MPs at Nicolson's luncheon like the Conservative MP General Edward Spears expressed some concern about the parts of the Karlsbad Programme declaring that Czechoslovakia's foreign policy should be in "harmony" with the foreign policy of Germany, and that to be German was to be a National Socialist and as such the Sudeten German Party was to be the only legal party in the proposed autonomous Sudeten region. Dirksen was especially anxious for Henlein to meet one Conservative backbencher, Winston Churchill, whom he considered to be one of the leading "anti-German" voices in the House of Commons. At his lunch with Churchill, Henlein used a historical analogy that he knew would appeal to him, namely that of the question of Home Rule for Ireland.  Henlein reminded Churchill how the government of H. H. Asquith (which Churchill was a minister in) had promised the Irish Home Rule, but failed to deliver in time, leading to the Irish war of independence and Ireland leaving the United Kingdom, going on to say that Czechoslovakia was in the same position in 1938 that the United Kingdom had been in 1913. As late as 3 June 1938, Churchill in a speech to the House of Commons described Heinlen as only seeking "Home Rule" for the Sudetenland, and expressed the hope if only Henlein could meet with President Beneš, then a mutually acceptable compromise plan for federalisation of Czechoslovakia could be achieved.

The only difficult interview that Henlein faced in London was when Group-Captain Christie once again arranged a meeting with Vansittart, now "kicked upstairs" to the powerless post of Chief Diplomatic Adviser because of his anti-appeasement views. During a dinner at Vansittart's house attended by Christie and Henlein, Vansittart asked Henlein how did he possibly think the Karlsbad programme was practical. Vansittart noted that Czechoslovakia was a democracy and under the Karlsbad programme, the Sudetenland was to have a regional government that would impose Gleichschaltung ("co-ordination") on all aspects of society under the grounds that National Socialism was merely the expression of Deutschtum ("Germanness"). Henlein was unable to explain to Vansittart just precisely how a one-party state could co-exist inside a democracy. On 15 May 1938, Henlein left London for Berlin, where he informed his masters that his visit had been a great success.

On 24 May 1938, Sir Alexander Cadogan, the Permanent Under-secretary at the Foreign Office, told the Hungarian chargé d'affaires in London that the Karlsbad programme was "justified" and the Czechoslovak Prime Minister Milan Hodža should give in to nearly of the 8 points of the programme. On 25 May, Lord Halifax met with the Dominion high commissioners, where he declared Czechoslovakia in its present form as a unitary state was untenable as the ethnic Germans and Czechs simply could not get along, and made it clear that he favored autonomy for the Sudetenland as the best case scenario, but he favored allowing Germany to annex the Sudetenland if Henlein could not reach an agreement with Hodža. In this regard, Halifax was especially interested in having the Canadian High Commissioner Vincent Massey talk to him about how French-Canadians and English-Canadians got along in the Canadian federation, which might provide a possible solution to the Czechoslovak crisis. The Canadian Prime Minister William Lyon Mackenzie King himself supported plans for the federalisation of Czechoslovakia, saying his country could be a model, and urged that the British government to pressure the Czechoslovak government to give to Henlein's Karlsbad programme as the best way to avoid a war.

Henlein presented his party's policy as striving to fulfill the "justified claims" of the then largely Nazified German minority. Henlein, often under direct orders from Berlin, deliberately had worked to help create a sense of crisis that was useful to Hitler's diplomatic and military efforts. In May 1938, in the local elections in the Sudetenland, the SdP's candidates for town and village councils won between 87%–90% of the votes cast, clearly showing that the majority of the Sudeten Germans now stood behind Henlein. Frustrated with the unwillingness of Henlein and Hodža to engage in talks in the summer of 1938, the British government believing that both parties wanted an agreement increasing came to favor sending an intermediary to Czechoslovakia who might be able to break the deadlock, which was the origin of the Runciman Mission. In August 1938, the British Liberal politician Lord Runciman visited Czechoslovakia to investigate the Sudeten issue, and he fell under Henlein's influence during his time in the Sudetenland. The Runciman report largely reflected Henlein's ideas as Runciman stated that the ethnic Germans and Czechs simply could not live together and should be separated.

In August 1938, Group-Captain Graham Christie met Henlein in a beer-hall in Karlsbad, and reported that far being from his usual mild-mannered self that Henlein under the influence of alcohol was abusive and arrogant, saying he hated the Czechs and did not want to live with them in the same state anymore. On 17 August 1938, General Louis-Eugène Faucher, the French military attache in Prague, reported to Paris that the Czechoslovak military intelligence had presented him with conclusive evidence that Henlein was planning together with the Abwehr (German military intelligence), an uprising in the Sudetenland for September. The initial plan for the Anschluss had called for Austrian Nazis to assassinate Franz von Papen, the German ambassador in Vienna, to provide a pretext for the Anschluss. The same plan was adopted for Czechoslovakia with Henlein ordered to have some of his followers to put on the uniforms of the Prague police and assassinate Baron Ernst von Eisenlohr, the German minister in Prague, to provide a pretext for war when the time was right. Additionally, Henlein was to have his followers to start attacking the Czechoslovak police in order to provide more "incidents" for a war.

In early September 1938, President Beneš announced the "Fourth Plan" for constitutional changes to make Czechoslovakia into a federation, which did not meet all of the demands of the Karlsbad programme, but would grant the Sudetenland autonomy. In response to the "Fourth Plan", Henlein announced on 7 September 1938 that he was breaking off all contact with the Castle (i.e. the Czechoslovak government) saying he was not interested in compromise, and the "Fourth Plan" was unacceptable. On 9 September 1938, Benito Mussolini in a speech formally endorsed all 8 points of the Karlsbad programme and denounced Czechoslovakia as a state "tainted" by its alliances with France and the Soviet Union. From 12 September 1938, forward, Henlein helped organise hundreds of terrorist attacks and two coup attempts by the Sudetendeutsches Freikorps paramilitary organisation affiliated with the SS-Totenkopfverbände, immediately after Hitler's threatening speech in Nuremberg at the Nazi Party's annual rally. On 12 September 1938, in his keynote speech at the Nuremberg Party Rally, Hitler finally dropped the demand for autonomy for the Sudetenland and formally demanded that the Sudetenland join Germany. The attempted uprising was quickly suppressed by Czechoslovak forces, whereafter Henlein fled to Germany only to start numerous intrusions into Czechoslovak territory around Asch as a commander of Sudeten German guerilla bands. Henlein's flight into Germany to escape arrest was widely seen as cowardice, and he always very sensitive towards criticism of his actions in September 1938.

Hitler's plans for Fall Grun (Case Green), scheduled for 1 October 1938 was sabotaged by Britain, who took Hitler's stated claim that all he wanted was the Sudetenland at face value, and did not realize the Sudetenland issue was a pretext for a war against Czechoslovakia. The Greek historian Aristotle Kallis wrote: "The problem [for Hitler] was that the British government took the irredentist alibi of Nazi expansionism quite seriously, eager to make concessions on these lines, without realising no territorial offer on ethnic grounds would ever satisfy the geographical prerequisites of the fascist 'new order'. The final, if ephemeral, solution, namely the cession of the Sudetenland to the Reich, was authorised on the grounds of the overwhelmingly German character of the population and region". In this regard, Kallis noted that Hitler's plans always called for the conquest of all of Czechoslovakia, not just the Sudetenland. The fact that Britain kept pressuring Czechoslovakia in September 1938 to make concessions sabotaged Hitler's plan for a war, which were based on the assumption that the Castle would not make concessions on the Sudetenland issue, thus allowing Hitler to present himself as being "forced" to invade Czechoslovakia. Kallis wrote that the bogus nature of Hitler's claim that he was only concerned about the treatment of ethnic Germans in the Sudetenland can be seen in that until 1939 he completely ignored the subject of the South Tyrol region of Italy, whose ethnic German population were treated far worse than the Sudetenlanders were. Kallis wrote that if Hitler was really concerned about the treatment of ethnic German minorities in other nations, he would never had allied himself with Benito Mussolini as Fascist Italy had the worse record in regards to treating its German minority in Europe, as the Italian government tried very hard to stamp out the use of German in South Tyrol.

Kallis wrote the Sudetenland dispute was a pretext for a war to destroy Czechoslovakia as the Czechoslovak government treated the German minority in the Sudetenland far better than the Italian government treated the German minority in South Tyrol. When Hitler finally did turn his attention to South Tyrol in 1939, he signed the South Tyrol Option Agreement with Mussolini calling for the German-speakers of South Tyrol to either move to Germany or be Italanized. For Hitler, an alliance with Fascist Italy outweighed any concern with the persecuted German community of South Tyrol. As the countdown for a war scheduled to begin on 1 October continued, Henlein's grew more anxious and desperate as it dawned on him that his beloved Sudetenland was going to be turned into a war zone, a prospect that caused him to sink into depression. The decisive moment in the crisis occurred on 27 September 1938 when Hitler decided not to go to war after all, citing the unenthusiastic response of the people of Berlin to a huge military parade he had ordered, saying he could not go to war with the German people not behind him. On 28 September 1938, Hitler told the French ambassador, André François-Poncet that he was willing to attend a conference in Munich to discuss a peaceful solution to the crisis with Mussolini to serve as a mediator. The Munich Agreement of 30 September 1938 ended the crisis and stated the Sudetenland was to "go home to the Reich" peacefully over a ten-day period in October 1938. Hitler saw the Munich Agreement as a diplomatic defeat as it "cheated" him out the war he was planning to start the next day, but Henlein was greatly relieved that his beloved Sudetenland escaped the horrors of war.

German occupation

Upon the Wehrmacht's entry into the Sudetenland, on 1 October 1938 Henlein was appointed Reichskommissar and Gauleiter for Reichsgau Sudetenland and became a SS-Gruppenführer (later an SS-Obergruppenführer). The SdP merged with Hitler's NSDAP on 5 November 1938. Henlein was responsible for organizing Kristallnacht pogrom in the Sudetenland on 9 November 1938, having local activists smash Jewish homes and businesses. For the next year, Henlein was deeply involved in campaign for the "de-Jewification" of the Sudeten economy, confiscating businesses and properties owned by Jews, and he himself confiscated a villa in Reichenberg (modern Liberec, Czech Republic) that belonged to a Jewish businessman, which remained his home until 1945.  Henlein was elected to the Reichstag as a deputy in December 1938 and formally joined the Nazi Party on 26 January 1939.

After the German takeover of what remained of Czechoslovakia in March 1939, Henlein served one month as head of the civil administration of the Protectorate of Bohemia and Moravia, nominally making him the number-two man in the Protectorate behind Reichsprotektor Konstantin von Neurath. Henlein welcomed the creation of the Protectorate of Bohemia-Moravia as restoring "natural Czech subservience" to the Germans, saying that the Bohemia and Moravia were "German lands" that unfortunately ended up being "occupied" by the Czechs, who now to serve as a "demographic and economic resources" to be exploited by Germany. However, most of the power ended up in the hands of his long-time rival Karl Hermann Frank. On 1 May 1939, Henlein was named Reichsstatthalter (Reich Governor) of Reichsgau Sudetenland, thereby uniting under his control the highest party and governmental offices in his jurisdiction. On 16 November 1942, he was named Reich Defense Commissioner for the Reichsgau. He continued to hold those positions until the end of the war.

Henlein attempted to place his long-term followers in key positions in his Reichsgau and, starting in the spring of 1939, he became locked into a battle over patronage with Reinhard Heydrich. Cornwall described the Henlein-Heydrich struggle as between two men who were "ideologically close", with the principle differences between Henlein's emphasis on Sudeten "particularism" as opposed to Heydrich's Großdeutschland nationalism, and the disgust of the völkisch fanatic Heydrich at Henlein's attempt to create a "big tent" right-wing party in the 1930s. Heydrich felt that Henlein should have presented the SdP as an unambiguous völkisch party, which indicated that Henlein was "soft", one of the gravest insults that the self-proclaimed "hard man" Heydrich could apply. In late 1939, Heydrich struck at Henlein by arresting over 50 leading Sudeten Nazis—all of whom were closely associated with Henlein's mentor Heinz Rutha—on charges of being part of a homosexual group whose used their positions in the SdP in the 1930s to recruit young men for sex. Heydrich chose to let the accused go on trial in early 1940 rather than taking them into "protective custody", when the courts heard lurid stories of how in the 1930s the SdP leaders had engaged in homosexual orgies.

Faced with that threat, Henlein went to Berlin to meet Heydrich and capitulated. Henlein agreed to fire the deputy Gauleiter, Fritz Köllner, and replaced him with Heydrich's nominee Richard Donnevert. Hitler tended to side with his Gauleiters in their disputes with other Nazis, and made clear that he was behind Henlein in his dispute with Heydrich. So removing Henlein was not practical for Heydrich, which is why he wanted to neutralize him by removing his followers from the local NSDAP leadership corps. In March 1940, at a party rally in Hoheneble (modern Vrchlabí, Czech Republic), Henlein completed his surrender by formally denouncing Rutha—the best man at his wedding in 1926—as a homosexual "pervert" whom history would not remember, and embraced Heydrich's Großdeutschland nationalism by denying there was any Suteden "particularism", asserting that Sudeten Germans were not different from the Reichdeutsch.

Henlein's major interest as a Gauleiter was pursuing his vendetta against the Czech minority in the Sudetenland numbering about 300,000 (about 10% of the population of the Sudetenland). Now that he was Gauleiter of the Sudetenland, Henlein revealed his real feelings about the Czechs, whom he deeply hated, and whose policies towards were described by Cornwall as "merciless". Henlein imposed what Cornwall called an "apartheid" regime on the Czech minority in the Sudetenland that was designed to ensure the total physical separation of the German and Czech communities with the Czechs being forced to accept considerably more inferior facilities than the Germans. Henlein openly stated that the ethnic Czechs in the Sudetenland were to serve as "helots" to the Germans, and he banned Czech children from going beyond primary school as he believed that allowing the Czechs any sort of education beyond primary school would encourage them to demand equality again. Henlein pursued tax policies that were highly discriminatory towards Czechs who owned homes, businesses and land, and in 1942–43, he confiscated much land owned by ethnic Czech farmers who had been unable to pay their taxes, and handed them over to 3,000 settlers who arrived from Germany. The general thrust of Henlein's policies was towards the complete Germanization of the Sudetenland, and only the unwillingness of the authorities in the Protectorate of Bohemia-Moravia to accept the ethnic Czechs of the Sudetenland prevented Henlein from expelling them all. However, the need of the German state to have Czechs to work in the war industries, especially when so many Sudeten German men had been called up for service with the Wehrmacht, meant that the Sudetenland had more Czechs living in it in 1945 rather had been in 1938. Henlein had protested against bringing Czechs from the Reich Protectorate of Bohemia-Moravia to work in the Sudetenland's factories and farms, which counteracted against his policy of reducing the Czech population, only to be told by Berlin that the needs of war industry and agriculture were far more important than his own anti-Czech obsessions.

Henlein had two sides of his personality, being on one hand a "sensitive soul" who loved to read poetry, take long walks in nature, play the piano, would cry for hours if somebody said something rude to him and was deeply concerned about the fate of his people, but on the other hand as a Gauleiter, he showed himself devoted to Hitler and executed with verve the policies of the Third Reich, showing no compassion or mercy to the Czechs or the Jews. The German historian Ralf Gebel compared Henlein to Arthur Seyss-Inquart, the Austrian Nazi who rejected the more thuggish elements of the Austrian Nazi Party and sought to preserve a distinctive Austrian identity within the Großdeutschland that Hitler was creating. Cornwall wrote that Henlein was a man who genuinely believed in völkisch ideology, but like many other Sudeten Germans wanted to keep a distinctive Sudeten identity alive even as he supported the Großdeutschland concept, making him something of an outsider in the NSDAP. Just as the lawyer and self-proclaimed "moderate" National Socialist Seyss-Inquart was repulsed by Captain Josef Leopold, so too was Henlein repulsed by SS Obergruppenführer Karl Hermann Frank whose views and methods were closer to Heydrich.

His political influence was limited.  He was one of the milder Nazis, prompting RSHA leader Reinhard Heydrich and several others to try to remove him. However, all efforts failed due to Henlein's good relations with Hitler. When Henlein heard of Heydrich's assassination, he openly celebrated the news by visiting the local beer-hall to get drunk. With Heydrich gone, Henlein turned on Donnevert, telling him in October 1942 that he was "not a clown" who could be pushed around, a statement that revealed much about his wounded pride.  In late 1942, Henlein completed the campaign to make the Sudetenland judenfrei ("free of Jews") by deporting the last Jews to Theresienstadt. In February 1943, Henlein prevented Donnevert from entering his office by changing the locks, and fired him in August 1943. For the next two years, Henlein reigned supreme in his Gau and rehired many of the men he had been forced to fire in 1940. Henlein's willingness to assert himself won him the respect of Martin Bormann who called him in July 1944 a "historic personality" and "an especially reliable party comrade". In the last days of World War II, Henlein spent his time in what Cornwall called a "mad scheme" to persuade Hitler to abandon Berlin for the Sudetenland, from whose mountains he would continue the war and launch a new invasion of the Soviet Union. In his speech delivered on 8 May 1945 in Reichenberg, Henlein explained all his actions as being motivated only by his love of the Sudetenlanders, saying all his actions were those of "a child of my era, the executor of all your desires and yearnings, as the representative of your will".

Arrest and suicide
On 10 May 1945, while in American captivity in the barracks of Pilsen, he committed suicide by cutting his veins with his broken glasses. He was buried anonymously in the Plzeň Central Cemetery. 

Henlein’s legacy of returning Sudetenland to the German state was reversed following the war and the entire ethnic German population of the Sudetenland was expelled to Germany in 1945–46, under the Beneš decrees. In Czech, Henleinovci 'Henleinists' is a term of abuse, meaning a traitor or fifth-columnist. After the way in which most of the Sudeten Germans had supported Henlein in 1938, Beneš – who had once believed that Germans and Czechs could coexist – became utterly convinced of Henlein's point that Germans and Czechs could not co-exist, and to avoid that mistake again, had all of the ethnic Germans expelled in 1945–46. Robbins argued that it would have been better for the Sudeten Germans in the long run, and in their own self-interest, to be loyal to Czechoslovakia rather than following Henlein into a disaster, noting it was because of leaders like Henlein that people in the Sudetenland now all speak Czech rather than German.

In fiction
Harry Turtledove's The War That Came Early alternate history novel series begins with Henlein being assassinated on 28 September 1938, causing a version of WWII to begin in 1938.

"Henleinists" are a looming presence throughout Martha Gellhorn's novel A Stricken Field (1940).  Republished 2011, .

Henlein is the subject of a murder investigation by detective Bernie Gunther in Philip Kerr's novel "Prague Fatale". Published 2011.

He was also portrayed in Czechoslovak film "Jára Cimrman ležíci spíci", where he is child living in fictional village of Liptákov,

Summary of his career

Dates of rank 
 SS-Gruppenführer: 9 October 1938
 SS-Obergruppenführer: 21 June 1943

Awards / Decorations

War Merit Cross 1st and 2nd Class Without Swords

See also
Germans in Czechoslovakia (1918–1938)
List SS-Obergruppenführer

Notes

References

External links

 Konrad Henlein in Britannica
 Konrad Henlein (in German)
 

1898 births
1945 suicides
Politicians from Liberec
Austro-Hungarian prisoners of war in World War I
World War I prisoners of war held by Italy
Nazi Party officials
Gauleiters
SS-Obergruppenführer
Czechoslovak politicians who committed suicide
German Bohemian people
Sudeten German Party politicians
Nazis who committed suicide in prison custody
Members of the Reichstag of Nazi Germany
Suicides by sharp instrument in the Czech Republic
Prisoners who died in United States military detention
20th-century Freikorps personnel
Suicides in Czechoslovakia
1945 deaths